Hok Tau Wai is a village in Fanling, in the North District of the New Territories of Hong Kong.

Administration
Hok Tau Wai is a recognized village under the New Territories Small House Policy. It is one of the villages represented within the Fanling District Rural Committee. For electoral purposes, Hok Tau Wai is part of the Queen's Hill constituency, which is currently represented by Law Ting-tak.

References

External links

 Delineation of area of existing village Hok Tau Wai (Fanling) for election of resident representative (2019 to 2022)
 Antiquities Advisory Board. Historic Building Appraisal. Old Village Houses, Nos. 15, 16 & 17 Hok Tau Tsuen Pictures
 Antiquities Advisory Board. Historic Building Appraisal. Watchtower, Attached to No. 15 Hok Tau Tsuen Pictures

Villages in North District, Hong Kong
Fanling
Hok Tau